George Vincent "Skinner" Poulin (September 17, 1887 – May 3, 1971) was a professional ice hockey player who played for the Montreal Canadiens in the National Hockey Association and the Victoria Aristocrats in the Pacific Coast Hockey Association. He was part of the original Montreal Canadiens team in the 1909–10 season and played in the team's first game on January 5, 1910.

Poulin won a Stanley Cup with the Canadiens in 1916.

During the tail-end of his playing career, while playing in Saskatoon, Poulin became engaged as a referee, and for the 1922–23 WCHL season he was appointed referee-in-chief for the league.

Playing style
Poulin, standing at five feet and six inches, was a fairly small forward among his contemporaries, but he deployed a physically engaging style of play to compensate for his lack of height and weight. In the local Victoria newspapers, while playing for the Victoria Aristocrats in the PCHA, he was often referred to as the "pepper box", in reference to his aggressive and peppery playing style.

When the PCHA, prior to the 1914–15 season, lay forward a rule change that would prevent body-checking from within ten feet of the fence, Poulin voiced his displeasure and claimed that ice hockey was the only sport where a light man like himself could use his body to his advantage. Poulin claimed that hard checking and Victoria's "get the man" tactics had played a large part in the club winning two consecutive PCHA championships in 1913 and 1914.

Despite Poulin's fears of a less hard-hitting league in 1914–15 he continued to deploy a physically engaging style of hockey which led to him leading the PCHA in penalty minutes that season, something he had also done the season prior, earning him the "bad man" moniker of Pacific coast hockey for a second consecutive year.

Career statistics

Sources:

References

Notes

General

External links

Official Montreal Canadiens biography (ourhistory.canadiens.com)
Article on first game (slam.canoe.ca)

1887 births
1971 deaths
Canadian ice hockey centres
Franco-Ontarian people
Ice hockey people from Ontario
Montreal Canadiens (NHA) players
Montreal Wanderers (NHA) players
Saskatoon Sheiks players
Stanley Cup champions
Victoria Aristocrats players
Winnipeg Maple Leafs players